During the 1974–75 Scottish football season, Celtic competed in Scottish Division One.

Results

Scottish Division One

Scottish Cup

Scottish League Cup

European Cup

Drybrough Cup

Glasgow Cup

Replay not played

See also
Nine in a row

References

Celtic F.C. seasons
Celtic